The Order of the Baobab is a South African civilian national honour, awarded to those for service in business and the economy; science, medicine, and for technological innovation; and community service. It was instituted on 6 December 2002, and is awarded annually by the President of South Africa. The order is named after the baobab tree, which was chosen as a symbol because of its endurance and tolerance, its vitality, its importance in agro-forestry systems, and its use as a meeting place in traditional African societies.

Until the Order of Luthuli and the Order of Ikhamanga were established in 2004, the Order of the Baobab also covered service in the fields now covered by those orders.

Current classes
The three classes of appointment to the Order are, in descending order of precedence:

 Supreme Counsellor of the Baobab is gold, for exceptional service (SCOB)
 Grand Counsellor of the Baobab is silver, for distinguished service (GCOB) 
 Counsellor of the Baobab is bronze, for dedicated service (COB)

Symbolism
The central motif is a baobab tree, one of the oldest trees in Africa, with roots symbolising longevity. The badge is bordered by a nonagon shape, a nine-sided polygon, with each side representing one of the nine South African provinces. It represents the many different areas of possible contribution and service, in building a prosperous nation. The roughly rectangular shaped plaque, is textured to represent the baobab tree bark that is commonly used to make mats and hats.

The ribbon is gold, with recurring cream-coloured baobab silhouettes down the centre. All three classes are worn around the neck. The South African coat of arms is displayed on the reverse of the badge.

Recipients
These are all the recipients, in order of most recent:

See also
 South African civil honours

References

External links
 South African government website
  South African Medals Website

 
Orders, decorations, and medals of South Africa
Orders of South Africa
Awards established in 2002
2002 establishments in South Africa